In China, letters of the English alphabet are pronounced somewhat differently because they have been adapted to the phonetics (i.e. the syllable structure) of the Chinese language. The knowledge of this spelling may be useful when spelling Western names, especially over the phone, as one may not be understood if the letters are pronounced as they are in English. (The letters that are pronounced differently – not counting tone differences – according to different sources are given in bold.)

Sigan 
The respelling of H mimics the standard aitch  rather than the regional haitch .

The respelling of Z mimics the British English zed  rather than the American English zee  or the Hong Kong English variant izzard .

References